Gezachw Yossef (born 11 January 1975) is an Israeli long-distance runner. He represented his country at the 2010 World Indoor Championships narrowly missing the final.

International competitions

Personal bests
Outdoor
800 metres – 1:47.91 (Namur 1998)
1500 metres – 3:40.90 (Uden 2009)
3000 metres – 7:51.40 (Liège 2009)
5000 metres – 13:31.45 (Heusden-Zolder 2009)
10,000 metres – 28:37.48 (Tel Aviv 2010)
3000 metres steeplechase – 10:10.86 (Dubnica nad Váhom 2015)
Half marathon – 1:07:11 (Tel Aviv 2008)
Marathon – 2:15:07 (Prague 2012)

Indoor
800 metres – 1:51.73 (Indianapolis 2000)
1000 metres – 2:24.49 (Columbia 1998)
One mile – 4:03.52 (Fayetteville 2000)
3000 metres – 7:59.44 (Turin 2009)
5000 metres – 14:17.81 (Birmingham 2011)

References

1975 births
Living people
Israeli male middle-distance runners
Israeli male long-distance runners
Israeli people of Ethiopian-Jewish descent
Sportspeople of Ethiopian descent
Competitors at the 1999 Summer Universiade